Dmitri Dmitrievich Kugryshev (born 18 January 1990) is a Russian professional ice hockey forward. He is currently playing with HC Vityaz in the Kontinental Hockey League (KHL).

Playing career
Kugryshev was selected by the Washington Capitals in the 2nd round (58th overall) of the 2008 NHL Entry Draft. He originally pursued his NHL ambition in transitioning to a major junior career in North America with the Quebec Remparts of the Quebec Major Junior Hockey League before signing a three-year entry-level contract with the Capitals on March 9, 2010.

At the completion of the 2016–17 season, Kugryshev alongside Semyon Koshelyov was traded by CSKA to Avangard Omsk in exchange for Anton Burdasov on May 2, 2017.

After spending the 2017–18 season, with Avangard posting 11 goals and 25 points in 50 games, Kugryshev left as a free agent to sign a one-year deal with Salavat Yulaev Ufa on May 1, 2018.

On 8 July 2021, Kugryshev joined his fifth KHL outfit, in agreeing to a two-year contract as a free agent with HC Spartak Moscow.

During his final season under contract with Spartak Moscow in 2022-23, in collecting just 2 goals and 3 points in 17 games, Kugryshev was transferred from Spartak to divisional rivals, HC Vityaz, on 21 November 2022.

Personal life 
Kugryshev married Yana Kudryavtseva, an Olympic rhythmic gymnast, in 2018. They have two daughters : Eva, born on 25 December 2018 and Zoya, born on 29 August 2020.

Career statistics

Regular season and playoffs

International

Awards and honours

References

External links

1990 births
Living people
Avangard Omsk players
HC CSKA Moscow players
Hershey Bears players
Quebec Remparts players
Russian ice hockey forwards
Salavat Yulaev Ufa players
HC Sibir Novosibirsk players
South Carolina Stingrays players
HC Spartak Moscow players
HC Vityaz players
Washington Capitals draft picks
People from Balakovo
Sportspeople from Saratov Oblast